Vorozhba is a city in Sumy Raion, Sumy Oblast, Ukraine. Population:

References

Cities in Sumy Oblast
Kharkov Governorate